The Tata Nano Singur controversy was a controversy generated by land acquisition of a proposed Tata Motors automobile factory at Singur in Hooghly district, West Bengal, India. The factory would have been used to build the compact car Tata Nano.

Tata Motors started constructing a factory to manufacture a car, Tata Nano which was estimated to cost $2,500 . The small cars were scheduled to roll out of the factory by 2008.

The rule is meant for public improvement projects, and the West Bengal government wanted Tata to build in its state. The project was opposed by activists and opposition parties in Bengal.

Small car manufacturing facility

Singur was chosen by the company among six sites offered by the state government. The project faced massive opposition from displaced farmers. The unwilling farmers were given political support by West Bengal's then opposition leader Mamata Banerjee. Banerjee's "Save Farmland" movement was supported by environmental activists like Medha Patkar, Anuradha Talwar and Arundhati Roy. Banerjee's movement against displacement of farmers was also supported by several Kolkata based intellectuals like Aparna Sen, Kaushik Sen, Shaonli Mitra and Suvaprasanna. Leftist activists also shared the platform with Banerjee's Trinamool Congress. The Tatas finally decided to move out of Singur on 3 October 2008. Ratan Tata blamed agitation by Banerjee and her supporters for the pullout decision. On 7 October 2008, the Tatas announced that they would be setting up the Tata Nano plant in Sanand,Gujrat.

Background

The rapid rise in the population of West Bengal has not been accompanied by significant economic growth. Key indicators such as unemployment rates, poverty rates, infant mortality rates, job growth rates, per capita income, mobile phone penetration rates lag the more industrialized states of India. Local politicians gained power by promising agricultural land to landless farmers, but given West Bengal's population density, the land-holdings are small and the yields are insufficient to sustain poor families. While the shift from agriculture to industrial jobs requires re-training, given India's economic growth, it provides an opportunity for earning higher income.

Several other states had offered land to Tata Motors for the project.

The people staying in the proposed land were forced to evacuate by the government. The compensation given was considered inadequate and the new housing facilities offered were delayed. This led to the protest of the peasants backed by opposition political parties.

The company had made substantial promises. According to their claims, Singur would become a mini-auto city and approximately 70 vendors would set up shop along with the factory. The total investment planned is to the tune of Rs 1,000 crore. The project had, however, generated controversy right from the start, particularly on the question of state acquisition of fertile agricultural land for private enterprise.

The land acquisition controversy 

On 23 September 2008, Tatas decided to leave Singur in West Bengal, the decision is reported to have been made by the Tata management and the Bengal government had been informed. On 3 October it became official that TATA will leave Singur (WB) when Ratan Tata announced it in a press conference in Kolkata.

While the ruling party has gone all out
Others say the provisions of this act were allegedly not been met.

The law has provisions for state taking over privately held land for public purposes but not for developing private businesses. The illegality of the acquisition has been substantially conceded by the Kolkata High Court.

The Tata Motors site is the most fertile one in the whole of the Singur, and the Singur block, in turn, is among the most highly fertile in West Bengal. Consequently, almost the entire local population depends on agriculture with approximately 15000 making their livelihood directly from it. With the number of direct jobs to be created no more than about 1,000, many of which are expected to go to outsiders, the local populace felt threatened for their livelihood. Environmental degradation is also feared.

Chief protesters include the opposition parties spearheaded by the Trinamool Congress under Mamata Banerjee and Socialist Unity Centre of India. The movement has received widespread support from civil rights and human rights groups, legal bodies, social activists like Medha Patkar and Anuradha Talwar, Booker prize-winning author Arundhati Roy and Magsaysay and Jnanpith Award-winning author Mahasweta Devi. Other intellectuals, writers like the poet Ruchit Shah, artists like Subhaprasanna, theatre and film personalities like Shaoli Mitra, Aparna Sen etc. have pitched in. The state police force has been used to restrict their access to the area. The Nobel Laureate Amartya Sen supported the idea of factory but he however opposed forcible acquisition of land.

Preliminary surveys by officials of the state and Tata Motors faced protests, and manhandling on one occasion, from the villagers organized under the Save Singur Farmland Committee with Trinamool Congress forming its chief component. It is reported that Naxalite elements hold sway over the direction the agitation takes and the Trinamool Congress chief Mamata Banerjee takes no decisions without consulting them.

The state government imposed the prohibitory Section 144 of the Indian Penal Code for initially a month and then extended it indefinitely. The imposition has been declared illegal by the Kolkata High Court 

While landless peasants and sharecroppers fear losing out entirely, sections of the locals, particularly those owing allegiance to the CPI(M) have welcomed the factory. These count chiefly among the owners of bigger portions of the land even as discrimination in the compensation has been alleged.

A section of those promised jobs at the factory have boycotted classes while training in protest against the alleged going back on the promise.

In the 2011 state assembly elections, while the sitting Trinamool Congress MLA, Rabindranath Bhattacharya retained the Singur seat, Becharam Manna, the convener of Krishi Jami Raksha Samiti, won the adjoining Haripal seat.

Fencing off the land

The land earmarked for the project was taken control of by the state administration amidst protests and fencing off commenced on 1 December 2006. Mamata Banerjee, who was prevented from entering Singur by the state police, called a statewide bandh in protest while legislators belonging to her party turned violent in the legislative assembly causing damage to furniture.  Later, she went on a 26-day hunger strike . During this period she presented affidavits of farmers apparently unwilling to part with their land. On 4 December, Banerjee began the historic 26-day hunger strike in Kolkata protesting the forcible acquisition of farmland by the government. The then-President A. P. J. Abdul Kalam, who was concerned about her health, spoke to the then-Prime Minister Manmohan Singh to resolve the issue. Kalam also appealed to Ms Banerjee to withdraw her fast as "life is precious". A letter from Manmohan Singh was faxed to Gopalkrishna Gandhi, the then-Governor of West Bengal, and then it was immediately delivered to Mamata. After receiving the letter Mamata finally broke her fast at midnight on 29 December.

The fenced off area has been regularly guarded, besides large contingents of policemen, by cadres of the CPI(M) party. They were accused of the multiple rape followed by burning to death of teenage villager Tapasi Malik who was active in the protests, on 18 December 2006. Negligence and political interference in the probe into her death have been alleged. Later, CPI(M) activist Debu Malik and based on his statement, CPI(M) zonal committee secretary Suhrid Dutta were arrested by the Central Bureau of Investigation in connection with the crime.

Intermittent attacks by villagers have since continued on the fence. However, continuing agitations against the project appeared to have proved ineffective and a farmer who lost land committed suicide

On the other hand, the pro-factory villagers siding with the CPI(M) have made accusations against the Naxalite faction of the 'Save Singur Farmland Committee' of threats and violence against them.

Construction of plant
Tatas ceremonially initiated the construction of the plant on 21 January 2007. The Tata Group announced on 3 October 2008 that they are pulling out of Singur due to the political unrest and agitation.

Procedural lacunae

Other aspects of the process of setting up the factory that had come under severe criticism are the government's secrecy on the details of the deal and the chief minister's furnishing of false information, including in the legislative assembly Vidhan Sabha. In particular, the concessions being given to Tata Motors have not been publicly revealed. The falsehoods of the chief minister chiefly pertain to claims made by him of having acquired   through voluntary consent of the owners without the use of force.

The Kolkata High Court declared the acquisition prima facie illegal.
The air seemed to have cleared somewhat when the High Court ordered the state government to submit correct figures following which an affidavit but was not satisfied with the result. In an affidavit filed later in June 2007, the government admitted to 30 per cent of the land was acquired from farmers without consent. The affidavit remains unclear on whether the lack of consent is based on insufficiency of the compensation or refusal to sell altogether.

Tata pulls out
On 3 October 2008, after a brief meeting with the Chief Minister, Ratan Tata declared his decision to move the Nano Project out of West Bengal. Tata mentioned his frustration with the opposition movement at Singur Project led by Trinamool Congress chief Ms. Mamata Banerjee.  Ms Banerjee responded by referring to actions by Tatas and the state government.

The CM of Gujarat, Narendra Modi then sent an SMS to Mr. Ratan Tata, which simply said "Suswagatham", to persuade him to relocate the Nano factory to Gujarat.

It took 14 months to build a new factory in Sanand, Gujarat compared with 28 months for the Singur factory.

Land return
In 2016, the Supreme Court quashed the West Bengal government's acquisition of 997 acres of agricultural land for Tata Motors and ordered its return to 9,117 landowners.

See also
 Tata Motors
 Tata Group

References

21st-century conflicts
21st century in India
Hooghly district
Economy of West Bengal
Politics of West Bengal
2008 in India
Controversies in India
2000s in West Bengal
Political history of West Bengal
Controversies surrounding the Tata Group
Conflicts in 2008
Economic history of India (1947–present)
Human rights abuses in India
Communist Party of India (Marxist)
Land rights movements
Far-left terrorism
Enforced disappearances
Politics of India
Protest-related deaths
Protests in India
Political repression
Police brutality in India
Police misconduct in India
Discrimination in India
Crimes against humanity
Torture
Special economic zones
Communist repression
Communist terrorism
2008 in Indian politics
2009 in Indian politics
2000s conflicts
2008 protests
2009 protests
2008 in Indian economy